The Old Church of St. Joachim and St. Anne is a historic Catholic church building located in the Pleasant Plains area of Staten Island in New York City. It is located north of Hylan Boulevard between Page Avenue and Richard Avenue, in the southern part of the island, near the Atlantic Ocean and Tottenville.

History

It was constructed in 1891 on the grounds of Mount Loretto, an institution founded by Father John Drumgoole to house destitute street children who were living on the streets of the city. The church principally served the children and staff of that institution. Mount Loretto was conceived as a farm and at the time of its construction the church stood in a rural area.

In 1972, the church was one of the locations used in the movie The Godfather. In 1973, a serious fire largely destroyed the church, leaving only its facade. The owner of the church, the Archdiocese of New York, rebuilt it in 1976, incorporating the facade into the new structure.

The church is not listed as a parish on the website of the archdiocese. It appears to be in good condition though it may not be in regular use as of 2015. Mount Loretto, officially known as the Mission of the Immaculate Virgin, continues to use the surrounding property for various of its social service programs, including some residential programs. A small plaza in front of the church features bells saved from the steeples of the church during the 1973 fire and an 1891 statue of Father Drumgoole by sculptor Robert Cushing.

The church is currently the tallest building in Staten Island.

References 

Roman Catholic churches in Staten Island
Closed churches in the Roman Catholic Archdiocese of New York
Closed churches in New York City
Building and structure fires in New York City
Church fires in the United States